Serkan Acar (August 31, 1948 in Istanbul died April 18, 2013 in Istanbul) was a Turkish football player of Fenerbahçe. He played as a defender and sometimes as midfielder. He was the General Manager of Fenerbahçe S.K.

He started his career with Fenerbahçe S.K. and played there  for 11 years between 1967 and 1978. He scored 13 goals in 295 matches and won 1967-68, 1969–70, 1973–74, 1974–75 and 1977-78 Turkish League also won 1973-74 Turkish Cup.

References

1948 births
Footballers from Istanbul
Turkish footballers
Fenerbahçe S.K. footballers
Fenerbahçe S.K. board members
2013 deaths
Association football defenders
Deaths from cancer in Turkey
Burials at Karacaahmet Cemetery
20th-century Turkish people